Maja Vidmar (born December 30, 1985) is a Slovenian rock climber and sport climber, known for winning the 2007 Lead Climbing World Championship. She started competing in 2000, at the age of 15, and retired from international competitions at the age of 29, after participating in the 2014 Lead Climbing World Championship and 2014 Lead Climbing World Cup. She was the second-ever woman in history to onsight an  route.

Career 
Vidmar started climbing at the age of 12 years, in 1997 in a climbing gym. Next year, she started competing in national events. In 2000, at the age of 15, she won the European Youth Cup in Lead climbing.

Her most relevant competitive achievements were obtained between 2005 and 2011, as shown below. In 2008, she also received the La Sportiva Competition Award.

She retired from international competitions at the age of 29, after participating in the 2014 Lead Climbing World Championship and 2014 Lead Climbing World Cup.

Rankings

Climbing World Cup

Climbing World Championships

Number of medals in the Climbing World Cup

Lead

Rock climbing

Redpointed 
8c+/5.14c:
 Attila Lunga – Baratro (ITA) – June 18, 2009
8c/5.14b:
 Strelovod – Mišja Peč (SLO) – March 27, 2009
 Sikario Sanguinario – Baratro (ITA) – September 12, 2007
 La peste nera – Baratro (ITA) – September 12, 2007
 Osapski pajek – Osp (SLO) – May 8, 2006

Onsighted 
8b+/5.14a:
 Humildes pa casa – Oliana (ESP) – April 2010. Second-ever woman in history to onsight and 8b+ route.
8b/5.13d:
 Spartan wall – Kalymnos (GRE) – May 26, 2009

References

External links 

 

1985 births
Living people
Female climbers
Slovenian rock climbers
World Games gold medalists
Competitors at the 2009 World Games
IFSC Climbing World Championships medalists
IFSC Climbing World Cup overall medalists